Parathesis vulgata is a species of plant in the family Primulaceae. It is found in Guatemala and Honduras.

References

vulgata
Endangered plants
Taxonomy articles created by Polbot